Charles Larrabee may refer to:

C. X. Larrabee (Charles Xavier Larrabee, 1843–1914), co-founder of the town of Fairhaven, Washington
Charles H. Larrabee (1820–1883), U.S. Representative from Wisconsin